The 1917 Camp Meade football team represented the United States Army's Camp Meade located in Maryland during the 1917 college football season.

Former Carlisle Indians player Gus Welch played at quarterback for Camp Meade. Eddie Thayer, a former Penn star who played in Camp Meade's backfield, was selected by Walter Camp as a third-team player on the 1917 All-Service football team.

Everett "Hook" Mylin, formerly of Franklin and Marshall, was the team captain. He was wounded while fighting in France in 1918.

In 1918, Camp Meade did not field an all-cantonment team. Instead, the camp organized company teams with multiple games played each week.

Schedule

References

Camp Meade
Camp Meade football